Alexandra Teague is an American poet. Her book, Mortal Geography won the 2009 Lexi Rudnitsky Prize and the 2010 California Book Award for Poetry. Teague was awarded a 2011 National Endowment for the Arts Literature Fellowship. She graduated from Southwest Missouri State University, and from the University of Florida, with an M.F.A. Teague is an associate professor at the University of Idaho. She helped organize Writers Resist Hate.” She read at Get Lit 2017.

Works 
 Mortal Geography, New York: Persea Books, 2010. , 
 The Wise and Foolish Builders: poems, New York: Persea Books, 2015. , 
 The Principles Behind Flotation., Skyhorse, 2017. , 
 Brian Clements, Alexandra Teague, Dean Rader (eds.) Bullets into Bells: Poets & Citizens Respond to Gun Violence. Beacon, 2017. ,

References

External links 
 
 
 

Living people
American women poets
Missouri State University alumni
University of Florida alumni
People from Fort Worth, Texas
21st-century American poets
21st-century American women writers
Year of birth missing (living people)